Gǔ (谷) is a Chinese surname. According to a 2013 study it was 158th-most common surname in China, shared by 990,000 people or 0.075% of the population, with the province having the most people with the surname being Henan. The literal meaning of the surname is "valley" or "gorge".

Notable people
 Gu Kailai (谷开来 born 1958) is a Chinese former lawyer and businesswoman, wife of Bo Xilai
 Gu Junshan (谷俊山; born 1956) is a former lieutenant general in the People's Liberation Army (PLA)
 Gu Mu (谷牧; 1914–2009) was a Chinese revolutionary figure and politician
 Ku Cheng-ting (谷正鼎; 1903–1974) was a politician elected to the Legislative Yuan in 1948; younger brother of Ku Cheng-kang
 Ku Cheng-kang (谷正綱; 1902–1993) was a politician who served as Interior Minister of the Republic of China in 1950; older brother of Ku Cheng-ting
 Eileen Gu Olympic skier born in the United States representing People's Republic of China in the 2022 Winter Olympics

References 

Chinese-language surnames
Individual Chinese surnames